The HoPWF Television Championship was a secondary professional wrestling title in the House of Pain Wrestling Federation promotion. It was first won by LT who defeated Cabbie in Waynesboro, Pennsylvania on November 20, 2004. The title was defended primarily in the Mid-Atlantic and East Coast, most often in Hagerstown, Maryland, however the title was abandoned the following year.

Title history

References

Television wrestling championships